Syngrapha cryptica is a species of looper moth in the family Noctuidae. It is found in North America.

The MONA or Hodges number for Syngrapha cryptica is 8941.

References

Further reading

 
 
 

Plusiini
Articles created by Qbugbot
Moths described in 1978